is the 32nd single by the Japanese J-pop group Every Little Thing, released on August 30, 2006. It was the theme song of the drama Kekkon Dekinai Otoko.

Track listing
  (Words - Kaori Mochida / music - Daichi Hayakawa)

Chart positions

External links
  information at Avex Network.

2006 singles
Every Little Thing (band) songs
Songs written by Kaori Mochida
Japanese television drama theme songs